The Gallia Christiana, a type of work of which there have been several editions, is a documentary catalogue or list, with brief historical notices, of all the Catholic dioceses and abbeys of France from the earliest times, also of their occupants.

First efforts 

In 1621 Jean Chenu, an avocat at the Parlement of Paris, published Archiepiscoporum et episcoporum Galliæ chronologica historia. Nearly a third of the bishops are missing, and the episcopal succession as given by Chenu was very incomplete. In 1626, Claude Robert, a priest of Langres, published with the approbation of André Fremiot, Archbishop of Bourges, a Gallia Christiana. He entered a large number of churches outside of Gaul, and gave a short history of the metropolitan sees, cathedrals, and abbeys.

The Sammarthani 

Two brothers de Sainte-Marthe, Scévole (1571–1650) and Louis (1571–1656), appointed royal historiographers of France in 1620, had assisted Chenu and Robert. At the assembly of the French Clergy in 1626, a number of prelates commissioned these brothers to compile a more definitive work. They died before the completion of their work, and it was issued in 1656 by the sons of Scévole de Sainte-Marthe, Pierre de Sainte-Marthe (1618–90), himself historiographer of France, Abel de Sainte-Marthe (1620–71), theologian, and later general of the Oratory, and Nicolas-Charles de Sainte-Marthe (1623–62), prior of Claunay. On 13 September 1656, the Sainte-Marthe brothers were presented to the assembly of the French Clergy, who accepted the dedication of the work on condition that a passage suspected of Jansenism be suppressed. The work formed four volumes in folio, the first for the archdioceses, the second and third for the dioceses, and the fourth for the abbeys, all in alphabetical order. It reproduced a large number of manuscripts. Defects and omissions, however, were obvious. The Sainte-Marthe brothers themselves announced in their preface the early appearance of a second edition corrected and enlarged. 

As early as 1660 the Jesuit Jean Colomb published at Lyons the Noctes Blancalandanæ, which contains certain additions to the work of the Samarthani, as the brothers and their successors are often called. "The name of Sainte-Marthe", wrote Voltaire, "is one of those of which the country has most reason to be proud." The edition promised by the Sainte-Marthe brothers did not appear.

Revision by the Maurists 

Through his efforts the first volume appeared in 1715, devoted to the ecclesiastical provinces of Albi, Aix, Arles, Avignon, and Auch. In 1720 he produced the second volume dealing with the provinces of Bourges and Bordeaux; and in 1725 the third, which treated Cambrai, Cologne, and Embrun. 

After his death the Benedictines issued the fourth volume (1728) on Lyons, and the fifth volume (1731) on Mechelen and Mainz. Between 1731 and 1740, on account of the controversies over the Bull Unigenitus, Dom Félix Hodin and Dom Etienne Brice, who were preparing the latter volumes of the Gallia Christiana, were expelled from Saint-Germain-des-Prés. They returned to Paris in 1739 and issued the sixth volume, dealing with Narbonne, also (1744) the seventh and eighth volumes on Paris and its suffragan sees. Père Duplessis united his efforts with theirs, and the ninth and tenth volumes, both on the province of Reims, appeared in 1751. The eleventh volume (1759) dealing with the province of Rouen was issued by Père Pierre Henri and Dom Jacques Taschereau. In 1770 the twelfth volume on the province of Sens and province of Tarentaise appeared, and in 1785 the thirteenth, on the provinces of Toulouse and Trier. 

At the outbreak of the revolution, four volumes were lacking: Tours, Besançon, Utrecht, and Vienne. Barthélemy Hauréau published (in 1856, 1860 and 1865), for the provinces of Tours, Besançon and Vienne, respectively, and according to the Benedictine method, the fourteenth, fifteenth and sixteenth volumes of the Gallia Christiana. 

The province of Utrecht alone has no place in this great collection, but this defect has been remedied in part by the Bullarium Trajectense, edited by Gisbert Brom, and extending from the earliest times to 1378 (The Hague, 1891–96). 

The new Gallia Christiana, of which volumes I to V and XI to XIII were reprinted by Dom Paul Piolin between 1870 and 1877, and volumes VI to IX and XII by the publisher H. Welter, places after each metropolitan see its suffragan sees, and after each see the abbeys belonging to it. The original documents, instead of encumbering the body of the articles, are inserted at the end of each diocese under in a section titled Instrumenta. This colossal work does great honour to the Benedictines and to the Sainte-Marthe family. "The name of Sainte-Marthe", wrote Voltaire, "is one of those of which the country has most reason to be proud."

Later works 

In 1774 the Abbé Hugues du Temps, vicar-general of Bordeaux, undertook in seven volumes an abridgement of the Gallia under the title "Le clergé de France" of which only four volumes appeared. About 1867 Honoré Fisquet undertook the publication of an episcopal history of France (La France Pontificale), in which, for the early period, he utilized the Gallia, at the same time bringing the history of each diocese down to modern times. Twenty-two volumes appeared. 

Canon Albanès projected a complete revision of the Gallia Christiana, each ecclesiastical province to form a volume. Albanès, who was one of the first scholars to search the Lateran and Vatican libraries, in his efforts to determine the initial years of some episcopal reigns, found occasionally either the acts of election or the Bulls of provision. He hoped in this way to remove certain suppositious bishops who had been introduced to fill gaps in the catalogues, but died in 1897 before the first volume appeared. Through the use of his notes and the efforts of Canon Ulysse Chevalier three addition volumes of this "Gallia Christiana (novissima)", treating Arles, Aix, and Marseilles, appeared at Montbéliard.

See also 
 Catholic Church in France
 Jean-Barthélemy Hauréau

References 

 Dreux du Radier, Bibliothèque historique et critique du Poitou (Paris, 1754)
 Gallia Christiana, Vol. IV, Préface
 Gallia Christiana (novissima) (Montbéliard, 1899), Préface to the Aix volume
 de Longuemare, Une famille d'auteurs aux seizième, dix-septième et dix-huitième siècles; les Sainte-Marthe (Paris, 1902)
 Victor Fouque, Du "Gallia christiana" et de ses auteurs: étude bibliographique, Paris: E. Tross, 1857. Available on the Bibliothèque nationale's Gallica site.

External links 
 

1621 establishments in France
Directories
Religious studies books